The Abajo Mountains, sometimes referred to as the Blue Mountains, are a small mountain range west of Monticello, Utah, south of Canyonlands National Park and north of Blanding, Utah. The mountain range is located within the Manti–La Sal National Forest.

This mountain range, like both the La Sal Range and Henry Mountains in the same part of the Colorado Plateau, is formed about igneous intrusions that are relatively resistant to erosion. Some of these intrusions form laccoliths emplaced at depths of a few kilometers. The predominant igneous rock is porphyritic hornblende diorite. Ages of intrusion in the Abajo Mountains fall in the interval from 22 to 29 million years.

These mountain ranges are part of the Colorado Plateau province west of the greater ranges of the Rocky Mountains. The laccolith ranges are much younger and have a very different geologic origin.

The range was reputedly named by the Spanish in the 1700s, the name "Abajo" meaning "low".

References

Colorado Plateau
Mountain ranges of San Juan County, Utah
Laccoliths
Mountain ranges of Utah
Manti-La Sal National Forest